Government Maternity Hospital is a Maternity hospital in the pilgrim city of Tirupati, Andhra Pradesh, India. It is the largest maternity hospital in Andhra Pradesh. In 2013, it had 152 beds with minimum 50 deliveries being carried out per day. It serves majorly four districts of Rayalaseema (Chittoor, Kadapa, Kurnool, Anantapur), Nellore and Prakasam districts of Andhra Pradesh and few areas of Tamil Nadu. It was established in 1962.

References

Buildings and structures in Tirupati
Hospitals in Andhra Pradesh
Hospitals established in 1962
1962 establishments in Andhra Pradesh
Maternity hospitals in India